Embargo is a 2010 film that is an adaptation of a tale included in the 1978 Quasi Object by the Portuguese writer José Saramago.

Plot
Nuno is a man working at a hot dog stand, who also invented the machine which promises to revolutionize the shoe industry- a foot scanner. In the middle of a gasoline embargo and finding himself in a strange predicament, Nuno becomes mysteriously confined to his car, finding his life suddenly embargoed

External links

 

Portuguese comedy-drama films
2010s Portuguese-language films
2010 films
Films based on works by José Saramago